Let Love In may refer to:
 Let Love In (Nick Cave and the Bad Seeds album) (1994)
 Let Love In (A Cursive Memory album) (2010)
 Let Love In (Goo Goo Dolls album) (2006)
 "Let Love In" (song)
 Let Love In (Crystal Lewis album) (1990)